The Oconee River is a  river in the U.S. state of Georgia. Its origin is in Hall County and it terminates where it joins the Ocmulgee River to form the Altamaha River near Lumber City at the borders of Montgomery County, Wheeler County, and Jeff Davis County. Milledgeville, the former capital city of Georgia, lies on the Oconee River.

The Oconee River Greenway along the Oconee River in Milledgeville opened in 2008; the North Oconee River Greenway is in Athens, Georgia. J.W. McMillan's brick factory was located along the river.

Course
The Oconee River passes through the Oconee National Forest into Lake Oconee, a man made lake, near the towns of Madison and Greensboro off Interstate 20. From Lake Oconee, the river travels to Lake Sinclair, another manmade lake near Milledgeville, the town founded on Georgia's Fall Line and former state capital. South of Milledgeville, the river flows unobstructed until merging with the Ocmulgee River to form the Altamaha River. Along the river there are many sandbars and oxbow lakes while the forest bottomland swamp surrounding the Oconee extends for miles, creating a very remote setting. Swamps along the Oconee river include Cow Hell Swamp in Laurens County.

Name origin
The river's name derives from the Oconee, a Muskogean people of central Georgia. The Oconee lived in present-day Baldwin County, Georgia at a settlement known as Oconee Old Town, later moving to the Chattahoochee River in the early 18th century. The name exists in several variations, including Ocone, Oconi, Ocony, and Ekwoni.

River pollution
One of the main sources of pollution comes from fecal coliform bacteria, several species of bacteria found in human and animal feces. Fecal coliform bacteria enter the river through a number of sources; storm-water runoff leaving farmlands, storm-water runoff carrying pet waste, leaking septic and sewer lines contaminating surface or groundwater, and sewer spills throughout the watershed. Fecal coliform bacteria can be deadly to humans if ingested or acquired through an open wound. Fish caught in the Oconee Basin may be eaten if cooked thoroughly.

The second biggest form of pollution in the river is fertilizer. Nitrogen in fertilizer in the form of nitrates or ammonia, measured in parts per million, is found in regularly collected samples. These forms of nitrogen stimulate abundant growth of algae in the water.

The third largest source of pollution is sedimentation, typically caused by construction and urbanization.

Crossings
Crossings of the Oconee River include:
Oconee River Bridge, south of Milledgeville, site of American Civil War resistance of the Fourth Kentucky Regiment, plus a unit of convicts from the Milledgeville penitentiary and a battalion of Georgia Military Institute cadets vs. a Union army corps (part of Sherman's March to the Sea).
 The Herschel Lovett Bridge is a steel girder bridge over the Oconee River along the Dublin–East Dublin city line. It carries US 80/US 319/SR 26/SR 29/SR 31. The bridge was named for Herschel Lovett, a Dublin businessman and politician.

References

External links

 Oconee River Land Trust

Rivers of Baldwin County, Georgia
Rivers of Hall County, Georgia
Rivers of Montgomery County, Georgia
Rivers of Wheeler County, Georgia
Rivers of Jeff Davis County, Georgia
Rivers of Jackson County, Georgia